The Rolls-Royce Trent is a family of high-bypass turbofans produced by Rolls-Royce.

Launched as the RB-211-524L in June 1988, the prototype first ran in August 1990.

Its first variant is the Trent 700 introduced on the Airbus A330 in March 1995,
then the Trent 800 for the Boeing 777 (1996),
the Trent 500 for the A340 (2002),
the Trent 900 for the A380 (2007),
the Trent 1000 for the Boeing 787 (2011),
the Trent XWB for the A350 (2015),
and the Trent 7000 for the A330neo (2018).
It has also marine and industrial variants like the RR MT30

Development

Despite the RB211 success, the large civil turbofan market was dominated by General Electric and Pratt & Whitney, and Rolls-Royce share was only 8% when it was privatised in April 1987. 

At the September 1988 Farnborough Airshow, the  -524L development was confirmed, estimated at £300 million, to power the MD-11 and A330 as a full-scale model was unveiled by Frank Whittle.
By September 1992, the  Trent 600 for the MD-11 was abandoned and prototypes were rebuilt as Trent 700 engines for the A330 with a  fan.

In keeping with Rolls-Royce's tradition of naming its jet engines after rivers, this engine is named after the River Trent in the Midlands of England.

The UK government granted Rolls-Royce £450 million repayable launch investment, repaid with interest, to develop the RB.211 engine and the Trent family up to the Trent 900.
Rolls-Royce obtained £200 million for the Trent 8104, 500 and 600 variants in 1997, and £250 million for the Trent 600 and 900 variants in 2001, no aid was sought for Trent 1000 variant.

New proposed planes required higher thrust and customers wanted the Boeing 777 and Airbus A330 twinjets to fly Extended-range Twin-engine Operations at introduction.
Rolls-Royce decided to offer an engine for every large civil airliner, based on a common core to lower development costs, and the three-shaft design provided flexibility, allowing each spool to be individually scaled. 
The engine family is named after the River Trent, a name previously used for the RB.50, Rolls-Royce's first working turboprop engine; and the 1960s RB.203, a  bypass turbofan and the first three-spool engine, designed to replace the Spey but never introduced.

In 2019, Rolls-Royce delivered 510 Trent engines.

Design

Like its RB211 predecessor, the Trent uses a concentric three-spool design rather than a two-spool configuration. 
The Trent family keeps a similar layout, but each spool can be individually scaled and can rotate more closely to its optimal speed.
The core noise levels and exhaust emissions are lower than those of the RB211.

Hollow titanium fan blades with an internal Warren-girder structure achieve strength, stiffness and damage tolerance at low weight.
To operate in temperatures above their melting point, cooling air is bled from the compressor through laser-drilled holes on the hollow turbine blades, made from a single-crystal of a nickel alloy and covered by thermal barrier coatings.

In April 1998, the RB211-524HT was introduced for the 747-400 with the Trent 700 core, replacing the previous RB211-524G/H with 2% better TSFC, up to a 40% lower NOx emissions and a 50 °C cooler turbine.
The Trent 800 LP spool rotates at 3300 rpm, its  diameter fan tip travels at  m/s.
The Trent 900's  fan keeps a low mean jet velocity at take-off to lower the Airbus A380 noise.

Variants

First Trent 600 
By July 1991, the MD-11 Trent was abandoned after the demise of Air Europe, its only customer.
By February 1992, there were four Trent 600 engines with a  fan.
By September 1992, three were rebuilt as #Trent 700 engines for the A330 with a  fan.

Trent 700

Rolls-Royce was studying a RB211 development for the Airbus A330 at its launch in June 1987.
The Trent 700 was first selected by Cathay Pacific in April 1989, first ran in summer 1992, was certified in January 1994 and put into service in March 1995.

Keeping the characteristic three-shaft architecture of the RB211, it is the first variant of the Trent family.
With its  fan for a 5:1 bypass ratio, it produces 300.3 to 316.3 kN (67,500-71,100 lbf) of thrust and reaches an overall pressure ratio of 36:1.
It competes with the GE CF6-80E1 and the PW4000 to power the A330.

Trent 800

The Trent 800 is one of the engine options for the early Boeing 777 variants.

Launched in September 1991, it first ran in September 1993, was granted EASA certification on 27 January 1995, and entered service in 1996.
It reached a 40% market share, ahead of the competing PW4000 and GE90, and the last Trent-powered 777 was delivered in 2010.

The Trent 800 has the Trent family three shaft architecture, with a  fan.
With a 6.4:1 bypass ratio and an overall pressure ratio reaching 40.7:1, it generates up to 413.4 kN (92,940 lbf) of thrust.

Trent 8100 

By March 1997, Boeing studied 777-200X/300X growth derivatives for a September 2000 introduction: GE was proposing a  GE90-102B, while P&W offered its  PW4098 and Rolls-Royce was proposing a  Trent 8100.
The 454 kN (102,000 lbf) Trent 8104 design was to be completed by June 1998, while the -200X entry into service slipped to mid-2002.
Higher thrust was obtained with new swept fan blades while keeping a  fan.

The  Trent 8104 first ran on 16 December 1998, and exceeded 110,000 lbf (490 kN) of thrust five days later, before two other engines would join by mid-1999.
The swept fan blades produce 2-3% more flow at a given speed with the same  fan, for an additional  of thrust, while fan efficiency is 1% better.
The HP compressor rotors and stators and the IP compressor stators were designed with 3D aerodynamics.
The fan diameter was to reach 2.9 m (114 in) to increase the thrust.

In July 1999, Boeing selected the General Electric GE90 over the Trent 8115 and P&W offer to power exclusively the longer-range 777s, as GE offered to substantially finance the jet development, for around $100 million. 
Rolls-Royce later dropped the Trent 8115 but continued to work on the Trent 8104 as a technology demonstrator.

Trent 500

The Trent 500 exclusively powers the larger A340-500/600 variants.

It was selected in June 1997, first ran in May 1999, first flew in June 2000, and achieved certification on 15 December 2000.
It entered service in July 2002 and 524 engines were delivered on-wing until the A340 production ended in 2011.

Keeping the three spool architecture of the Trent family, it has the Trent 700's 2.47 m (97.5 in) fan and a Trent 800 core scaled down.
It produces up to 275 kN (61,900 lbf) of thrust at take-off and has a bypass ratio up to 8.5:1 in cruise.

Trent 900

The Trent 900 powers the Airbus A380, competing with the Engine Alliance GP7000.

Initially proposed for the Boeing 747-500/600X in July 1996,
this first application was later abandoned but it was offered for the A3XX,
launched as the A380 in December 2000.
It first ran on 18 March 2003,
made its maiden flight on 17 May 2004 on an A340 testbed,
and was certified by the EASA on 29 October 2004.

Producing up to 374 kN (84,000 lbf), the Trent 900 has the three shaft architecture of the Trent family with a  fan.
It has an 8.5-8.7:1 bypass ratio and a 37–39:1 overall pressure ratio.

Second Trent 600

In March 2000, Boeing was to launch the longer range 767-400ERX powered by  engines, with deliveries planned for 2004. 
In July, Rolls-Royce was to supply its Trent 600 for the 767-400ERX and Boeing 747X, while the European Union was limiting the Engine Alliance offer on quadjets.
Boeing offered the longer-range 767-400ERX with a higher MTOW and a higher thrust for better takeoff performance.
The 767-400ERX was dropped in 2001 to favor the Sonic Cruiser.
When Boeing launched the 747-8 in November 2005, it was exclusively powered by the General Electric GEnx.

Trent 1000

The Rolls-Royce Trent 1000 is one of the two engine options for the Boeing 787 Dreamliner, competing with the General Electric GEnx.

It first ran on 14 February 2006 and first flew on 18 June 2007 before a joint EASA/FAA certification on 7 August 2007 and service introduction on 26 October 2011.

The  engine has a Bypass ratio over 10:1, a  m fan and keeps the characteristic three-spool layout of the Trent series.

The updated Trent 1000 TEN with technology from the Trent XWB and the Advance3 aims for up to 3% better fuel burn, it first ran in mid-2014, was EASA certified in July 2016, first flew on a 787 on 7 December 2016 and was introduced on 23 November 2017.

Corrosion-related fatigue cracking of IP turbine blades was discovered in early 2016, grounding up to 44 aircraft and costing Rolls-Royce at least £ million.

By early 2018 it had a % market share of the decided order book.

The Trent 7000 is a version with bleed air used for the Airbus A330neo.

Trent 1500 

When the  MTOW A340-600HGW first flew in November 2005, Airbus was studying an enhanced version of the larger A340 variants to enter service in 2011.
It would better compete with the 777-300ER and its 8-9% lower fuel burn than the A340-600: improved General Electric GEnx or Trent 1500 engines would erode this by 6-7%.
The Trent 1500 would keep the Trent 500's 2.47 m (97.4 in) fan diameter and nacelle, with the smaller, advanced Trent 1000 core and a revised LP turbine for a bypass ratio increased from 7.5-7.6:1 to 9.5:1. The last A340 was delivered in 2011 as it was replaced by the updated A350XWB design.

Trent XWB

The Trent XWB was selected in July 2006 to power exclusively the Airbus A350 XWB.

The first engine was run on 14 June 2010,
it first flew on an Airbus A380 testbed on 18 February 2012,
it was certified in early 2013,
and it first flew on an A350 on 14 June 2013.

It keeps the characteristic three-shaft layout of the Trent, with a 3.00 m (118 in) fan, an IP and HP spool.
The engine has a 9.6:1 Bypass ratio and a 50:1 Pressure ratio

It had its first in-flight shutdown on 11 September 2018, as the fleet accumulated 2.2 million flight hours.
It is the most powerful among all Trent engines.

Trent 7000

The Rolls-Royce Trent 7000 powers exclusively the Airbus A330neo.

Announced on 14 July 2014, it first ran on 27 November 2015.
It made its first flight on 19 October 2017 aboard on the A330neo.
It received its EASA type certification on 20 July 2018 as a Trent 1000 variant.
It was first delivered on 26 November,
and was cleared for ETOPS 330 by 20 December.

Compared to the A330's Trent 700, the  engine doubles the bypass ratio to 10:1 and halves emitted noise. Pressure ratio is increased to 50:1 and it has a  fan and a bleed air system.
Fuel consumption is improved by 11%.

Non-aircraft variants

MT30 (Marine Turbine) 

The MT30 (Marine Turbine) is a derivative of the Trent 800 (with a Trent 500 gearbox fitted), producing 36 MW for maritime applications. The current version is a turboshaft engine, producing 36 MW, using the Trent 800 core to drive a power turbine which takes power to an electrical generator or to mechanical drives such as waterjets or propellers. Amongst others, it powers the Royal Navy's s.

Industrial Trent 60 Gas Turbine
This derivative is designed for power generation and mechanical drive, much like the Marine Trent. It delivers up to 66 MW of electricity at 42% efficiency. It comes in two key versions DLE (Dry Low Emission) and WLE (Wet Low Emission). The WLE is water injected, allowing it to produce 58 MW at ISO conditions instead of 52 MW. It shares components with the Trent 700 and 800. The heat from the exhaust, some 416–433 °C, can be used to heat water and drive steam turbines, improving efficiency of the package. Besides Rolls-Royce, a leading packager of the Trent 60 is UK-based Centrax LTD, a privately owned engineering firm based in Newton Abbot, UK.

Operational history 

First run in August 1990 as the model Trent 700, the Trent has achieved significant commercial success, having been selected as the launch engine for all three of the 787 variants (Trent 1000), the A380 (Trent 900) and the A350 (Trent XWB). Its overall share of the markets in which it competes is around 40%. Sales of the Trent family of engines have made Rolls-Royce the second biggest supplier of large civil turbofans after General Electric, relegating rival Pratt & Whitney to third position.
By June 2019, the Trent family had completed over 125 million hours.

Singapore Airlines is currently the largest operator of Trents, with five variants in service or on order, followed by British Airways with four variants in service.

Incidents 

On 17 January 2008, a British Airways Boeing 777-236ER, operating as BA038 from Beijing to London, crash-landed at Heathrow after both Trent 800 engines lost power during the aircraft's final approach. The subsequent investigation found that ice released from the fuel system had accumulated on the fuel-oil heat exchanger, leading to a restriction of fuel flow to the engines. This resulted in Airworthiness Directives mandating the replacement of the heat exchanger. This order was extended to the 500 and 700 series engines after a similar loss of power was observed on one engine of an Airbus A330 in one incident, and both engines in another. The modification involves replacing a face plate with many small protruding tubes with one that is flat.

On 4 November 2010, an uncontained engine failure (explosion) occurred in a Trent 972-84 powered Airbus A380-842 (Registration VH-OQA) of Qantas Flight QF32 while en route from Singapore to Sydney. The cause was traced to an incorrectly manufactured oil feed stub pipe. For further details refer to the article on the Trent 900.

Research

Affordable Near-Term Low Emissions

Between 1 March 2000 and 28 February 2005, the EU funded the  project, aiming to design and test two programs to reduce CO2 by 12–20% and nitrous oxides by up to 80% from 2007/2008, with an overall budget of €101.6 Million including €50.9 from the EU and coordinated by Rolls-Royce plc. It was equally shared between the  demonstrator and the CLEAN program for longer term technology applications. The ANTLE program targeted reductions of 12% in  emissions, 60% in NOx emissions, 20% in acquisition cost, 30% in life cycle cost and 50% in development cycle, while improving reliability by 60%. The test phase ended by summer 2005.

The ANTLE engine was based on a Rolls-Royce Trent 500. Rolls-Royce Deutschland was responsible of the high pressure compressor, Rolls-Royce UK of the combustion chamber and the high pressure turbine, Italian Avio of the intermediate pressure turbine, and ITP of the Low Pressure Turbine (LPT) and the external casing for an investment of €20.5 million, a 20% stake in the program. Volvo Aero was responsible of the rear turbine structures. It has a new 5 stage HP compressor, a lean burn combustor and unshrouded HP turbine and a variable-geometry IP turbine. Hispano Suiza's new accessory gearbox, Goodrich's new distributed control system, and Techspace Aero's new oil system were also fitted.

Advanced Low-Pressure System (ALPS) 
After flights test in 2014 of CTi fan blades with a titanium leading edge and carbon casing, they had indoor and outdoor tests in 2017, including crosswind, noise and tip clearance studies, flutter mapping, performance and icing conditions trials.
Rolls-Royce will ground test in 2018 its ALPS demonstrator: a Trent 1000 fitted with composite fan blades and case, including bird strike trials.

Advance 

On 26 February 2014, Rolls-Royce detailed its Trent future developments. The Advance is the first design, could be ready from the end of the 2020s and aim to offer at least 20% better fuel burn than the first generation of Trents.
The Advance bypass ratio should exceed 11:1 and its overall pressure ratio 60:1.

In previous Trents, the HP spool was similar and the engine grew by expanding the intermediate pressure spool work. The Advance reverses this trend and the load is shifted towards the high pressure spool, with a greater pressure ratio, up to 10 stages compressor compared to 6 on the Trent XWB and a two-stage turbine against the current single-stage, while the IP compressor will shrink from the 8 stages of today's XWB to 4 and the IP turbine will be single instead of two stages.

The Advance3 ground-based demonstrator includes lean burn, run before on a Trent architecture only; ceramic matrix composite (CMC) for turbine high-temperature capability in the first stage seal segments and cast-bond first stage vanes; hybrid ball bearings with ceramic rollers running on metallic races, required to manage high load environments inside smaller cores.

Opened in 2016, R-R's $30 million CMC facility in California produced its first parts, seals, for the start of their deployment before being used in the static components of the second-stage HP turbine.
The twin fuel-distribution system in the lean-burn combustor adds complexity by doubling the pipework and with a sophisticated control and switching system but should improve fuel consumption and lower NOx emissions.
Hybrid ceramic bearings are newly configured to deal with loading changes and will cope with higher temperatures.

More variable vanes in one IP and four HP compressor stages will be optimised for constant changes through the flight envelope.
An air pipe is produced by additive manufacturing and prototype components come from new suppliers.
The Advance3 will survey bearing load, water ingestion, noise sources and their mitigation, heat and combustor rumble while blade-tip, internal clearances and adaptive control operation are radiographed in-motion to verify the thermo-mechanical modelling.
The Boeing New Midsize Airplane needs falls in its thrust range.
Advanced cooled metallic components and ceramic matrix composite parts will be tested in a late 2018 demonstrator based on a Trent XWB-97 within the high temperature turbine technology (HT3) initiative.

The core will be combined with a Trent XWB-84 fan and a Trent 1000 LP turbine for mid-2017 ground testing.
The Advance3 demonstrator was sent from the Bristol production facility to the Derby test stand in July 2017 to be evaluated till early 2018.
The demonstrator began initial runs at Derby in November 2017.

In early 2018, the demonstrator attained 90% core power, reaching a  P30 pressure at the rear of the  compressor, while measuring bearing loads, changed by the different compressor arrangement.
The lean burn combustor did not generate any rumble as further tests will cover water ingestion, noise, X-rays of the engine operating, and core-zone and hot-end thermal surveys.
By July 2018, the Advance3 core ran at full power.
By early 2019, the engine had run over 100 hours.

Advanced low-emission combustion system (ALECSys) 

A standalone engine will test the ALECSys on ground before another will be flight tested. Indoor ground tests of the lean-burn combustor were concluded on a modified Trent 1000 in January 2018, before being sent to Manitoba for cold-weather trials in February 2018, covering start-ups and ice ingestion. Noise testing will follow on an outside rig, then flight tests in the next couple of years after 2018.

UltraFan 

After the Advance comes the UltraFan, which could be ready for service from 2025, a geared turbofan with a variable pitch fan system, promising at least 25% improvement in fuel burn, 
The geared/variable pitch UltraFan aims for a 15:1 bypass ratio and 70:1 overall pressure ratio.

The Ultrafan keeps the Advance core, but also contains a geared turbofan architecture with variable-pitch fan blades. As the fan will vary pitch to be optimised for each flight phase, it won't need a thrust reverser.

The variable pitch fan will facilitate low pressure ratio fan operability. Rolls-Royce will work with Industria de Turbo Propulsores to test IP turbine technologies that will go into the UltraFan. In Dahlewitz near Berlin, Rolls-Royce has built a power rig simulating loading conditions in flight, sized for  gear systems; and recruits 200 engineers. The specially constructed test rig is an €84 million ($94 million) investment.

In partnership with Liebherr, the  UltraFan gearbox was first run in October 2016.
After the initial set of low-speed fan rig tests and the casting of second-generation titanium aluminide IP turbine blades, the initial UltraFan demonstrator concept design should be frozen in 2017.
Tests simulated aircraft pitch and roll on an attitude rig in September 2016 to assess oil flow in the gearbox.
The gearbox went through high-power tests in May 2017.
The UltraFan will be 3 m (118 in) in diameter and its fan blades with titanium leading edges are evaluated under the ALPS programme.

At the September 2017 International Society for Air Breathing Engines (ISABE) conference in Manchester, UK, Rolls-Royce's Chief Technology Officer Paul Stein announced it reached .
In early 2018, a third gearbox was tested as testing assessed on endurance and reliability.
The first gearbox was disassembled for evaluation, confirming the component's performance predictions.
A complete demonstrator will be built in a few years from 2018.
In April 2018, Airbus agreed to provide aircraft integration and its nacelle and for flight testing, co-funded by the European Union research programme Clean Sky 2.

At the April 2018 ILA Berlin Air Show, flight testing was confirmed on Rolls-Royce's Boeing 747-200.
The demonstrator will generate  of thrust, exploiting current testing on the Advance 3 and the  gearbox.

Higher bypass and lower fan pressure ratio induce low-speed fan instability remedied by variable-pitch blades instead of a variable area jet nozzle.
Along with eliminating the thrust reverser, a short slim nacelle would be lighter and less draggy, but in reverse-thrust the flow would be distorted, having to be turned around the nozzle into the bypass duct, and then partly reversed again into the intermediate compressor.
The large fan could lead to gull-wing airframes.
By July 2018, the UltraFan configuration was frozen before detailed design and then component manufacture, for 2021 ground tests.
The  diameter planetary gearbox has five planet gears, is sized to power  turbofans and amassed over 250 hours of run time by early 2019.

In February 2019, potential introduction was delayed to 2027, to re-engine current aircraft, after full-scale ground tests in 2021.
A variable-pitch fan or a more electric architecture would be needed beyond the 25% improvement over the Trent 800, for the 2030s-2040s.
A  integrated starter-generator on the shaft cold end would allow a smaller accessory drive.
It could drive an aft-fuselage boundary layer suction fan for a 35% better efficiency than in 2000.

By February 2020, Rolls-Royce was manufacturing the 355 cm (140 in) diameter carbon fibre fan blades in Bristol, UK, saving with the composite fan case up to 700 kg (1,540 lb) on a twinjet.

Applications
 Airbus A330 (Trent 700)
 Airbus A330neo (Trent 7000)
 Airbus A340 (-500 and -600 series only) (Trent 500)
 Airbus A350 (Trent XWB)
 Airbus A380 (Trent 900)
 Boeing 777 (-200, -200ER and -300 series only) (Trent 800)
 Boeing 787 Dreamliner (Trent 1000)

Specifications

See also

Footnotes

Notes
 
1.Engine interchangeability makes the 787 a more flexible asset to airlines, allowing them to change from one manufacturer's engine to the other's in light of any future engine developments which conform more closely to their operating profile. The cost of such a change would require a significant operating cost difference between the two engine types to make it economical. A difference that does not exist with the engines today.
2.Singapore Airlines has 58 Trent 800 powered 777s and 5 Trent 500 powered A340-500s; it also has a further 19 Trent 700 powered A330-300s, 19 Trent 900 powered A380-800s and 20 Trent XWB powered A350 XWB-900s on order.  Should it select the Trent 1000 for its order of 20 787-9s, it will become the first airline to operate 6 different versions of the Trent.

References

External links

Rolls-Royce plc
Trent 500 series
Trent 700 series
Trent 800 series
Trent 900 series
Trent 1000 series
Trent XWB
Trent 60
MT30

High-bypass turbofan engines
Trent
1990s turbofan engines
Three-spool turbofan engines